The Man Who Surprised Everyone is a Russian film-drama directed by Aleksey Chupov and Natasha Merkulova, shot according to their own script in 2018. Member for the Horizons (Orizzonti) section (Best Actress Award) of the 75th Venice International Film Festival. It was selected as the Russia entry for the Best Foreign Language Film at the 76th Golden Globe Awards.

Plot
Siberian huntsman Yegor is an exemplary family man and a man respected in his village. He and his wife Natalya are waiting for their second child. Suddenly, Yegor learns that he is incurably sick, and that he has only two months left to live. Neither traditional medicine nor shamanic sorcery help the fight against the disease, and in the end Yegor decides to take a desperate step by trying to completely change his personality in order to deceive approaching death, as did the legendary drake Zhamba, the hero of the ancient Siberian epos.

Cast
 Yevgeny Tsyganov as Yegor Korshunov
 Natalya Kudryashova as Natalya, Yegor's wife  
 Yury Kuznetsov as grandfather Nikolay 
 Pavel Maykov as Zakhar
 Maxim Vitorgan as Professor
 Igor Savochkin as Fyodor
 Polina Raikina as Marina
 Vasily Popov as Artyom
 Amadu Mamadakov as Doctor

Critical response
   Deborah Young in The Hollywood Reporter:  While Kudryashova brings a wide range of emotions to flesh out the character of the wife, Tsyganov is quietly magnificent in the main role. Both go far beyond fairy tale stereotypes, even while their acting follows timeworn paths that seem inexorable. The tech work is sheer simplicity, following the spirit of Egor's quest in the most naturalistic way possible, without trying to prettify the mud-washed village and weather-beaten shacks. Vadim Krasnitsky's editing keeps the story-telling smooth and fluid.
 Anton Dolin in Meduza: This motion picture is finely balanced, its seemingly outrageous frame is held due to a deep study and understanding by the creators of the film of the mechanics of the  female  and  male  archetype in the Russian consciousness.

References

External links
 

Russian drama films
2018 drama films
Transgender-related films
Films directed by Natalya Merkulova